The Star-Lite Warp 1-A is an American homebuilt aircraft that was designed and produced by Star-Lite Engineering of Englewood, Ohio, introduced in 1996. When it was available the aircraft was supplied as a kit for amateur construction.

Design and development

The Warp 1-A features a cantilever mid-wing, a single-seat enclosed cockpit under a bubble canopy, fixed tricycle landing gear with wheel pants, a boom-mounted T-tail and a single pod-mounted engine in pusher configuration.

The aircraft is made from composites. The standard engine used is the  Rotax 503 two-stroke powerplant.

The manufacturer estimates the construction time from the supplied kit as 100 hours.

Operational history
In March 2014 one example, the prototype, was registered in the United States with the Federal Aviation Administration as an Experimental - Amateur-built, although its registration expired in June 2013.

Specifications (Warp 1-A)

References

External links
Official website archives on Archive.org
Photo of the prototype Warp 1-A

Warp 1-A
1990s United States sport aircraft
1990s United States ultralight aircraft
Single-engined pusher aircraft
Mid-wing aircraft
Homebuilt aircraft